The WTA Lyon Open (currently sponsored by 6ème Sens) is a tournament for female professional tennis players that has been held annually in the first week of March, debuting in the 2020 season. It is categorized as an WTA 250 level tournament and is part of the WTA Tour. The tournament is played on indoor hard courts.

Past finals

Singles

Doubles

See also
List of tennis tournaments
ATP Lyon Open

References

External links
 Official site - 6ème Sens

 
2020 establishments in France
Hard court tennis tournaments
Recurring sporting events established in 2020
Sport in Lyon
Tennis tournaments in France
WTA Tour
March sporting events